S. Weir Mitchell Elementary School is a historic elementary school located in the Kingsessing neighborhood of Philadelphia, Pennsylvania. It is part of the School District of Philadelphia. The building was designed by Henry deCoursey Richards and built in 1915–1916. 

It is a four-story, seven bay, red brick building with terra cotta and granite trim in the Late Gothic Revival-style. It was erected above a raised basement. It features a projecting entrance bay with oversized arched surround, projecting secondary entrance bays, terra cotta quoining, and an arched gable parapet.

The building was added to the National Register of Historic Places in 1986.

References

External links

School buildings on the National Register of Historic Places in Philadelphia
Gothic Revival architecture in Pennsylvania
School buildings completed in 1916
School District of Philadelphia
Southwest Philadelphia
Public K–8 schools in Philadelphia
1916 establishments in Pennsylvania